The Chilean submarine O'Brien was an  in the Chilean Navy.

Design and construction

The submarine, built by Scottish company Scott Lithgow, was laid down on 17 January 1971, and launched on 21 December 1972. The planned July 1974 completion was delayed by the need to redo internal cabling. She was commissioned into the Chilean Navy on 15 April 1976. The submarine was named after John Thomond O'Brien, who fought in the Chilean War of Independence.

Operational history

O'Brien was in service from the mid-1970s until the mid-2000s.

Decommissioning and fate

O'Brien and sister boat Hyatt were replaced by the Thomson-class submarines.

She is now permanently docked in the Chilean city of Valdivia where she is open to visitors as a museum ship.

See also
 List of active Chilean Navy ships
 List of decommissioned ships of the Chilean Navy

References

External links
 Chilean Navy
 World of Navies - Chile

O'Brien-class submarines (1972)
Ships built in Barrow-in-Furness
1972 ships
Museum ships in Chile